Jacob Merner Staebler (August 16, 1846 – May 7, 1906) was an insurance broker and politician in Ontario, Canada. He served as mayor of Berlin in 1891.

He was born in Wilmot Township, Waterloo County, Canada West. His father, Jacob Friederich Staebler, was born in Bernhausen, Esslingen in what is now the German state of Baden-Württemberg. His mother, Ann or Anna Muerner (or Merner), was from Switzerland.

He was elected to the Berlin town council in 1880. Staebler also served as president of the local Board of Trade. He died on May 7, 1906 and was buried at Mount Hope Cemetery in Kitchener.

His former home, built in the late 1870s, was purchased by John Metz Schneider during the early 1900s.

References

1846 births
1906 deaths
Mayors of Kitchener, Ontario
Canadian people of German descent
Burials at Mount Hope Cemetery, Kitchener, Ontario